Sajad Hussain Parray (born 25 April 2003) is an Indian professional footballer who plays as a defender for I-League club Gokulam Kerala, on loan from Indian Super League club Hyderabad.

Career

Parray made his professional club appearance for Indian Arrows on 10 January 2021 against Churchill Brothers in the I-League.

Career statistics

Club

Honours
India U20
SAFF U-20 Championship: 2022

References

2003 births
Living people
Footballers from Jammu and Kashmir
Indian footballers
India youth international footballers
Indian Arrows players
I-League players
Association football defenders